Walter Charles "Heinie" Jantzen (April 9, 1890 – April 1, 1948) was an American baseball player. 

Jantzen was born in Chicago in 1890.

He began playing professional baseball in 1910 with the Vincennes Alices in the Kentucky–Illinois–Tennessee League. In 1911, he continued in the minor leagues, playing for Vincennes as well as the Cairo Egyptians.

In 1912, he reached the major leagues, playing for the St. Louis Browns. He appeared in 31 games for the Browns between June 29 and September 13. He was a right fielder and compiled a batting average of .185 with 22 hits, 10 runs, one home run, and one RBI. In his 31 games in right field, he was never charged with an error and finished his career with a perfect 1.000 fielding percentage. 

In mid-September 1912, the Browns sent Jantzen to the Montgomery Rebels of the Southern Association.  He played for Montgomery during the 1913 and 1914 season. Jantzen continued playing professional baseball until 1921, including stints with the Little Rock Travelers of the Southern Association (1915-1916), Chattanooga Lookouts (1916), and Bloomington Bloomers of the Illinois–Indiana–Iowa League (1919-1921).

Jantzen died at age 57 in Hines, Illinois.

References

1890 births
1948 deaths
Major League Baseball right fielders
St. Louis Browns players
Burials at Rosehill Cemetery
Vincennes Alices players
Vincennes Hoosiers players
Cairo Egyptians players
Montgomery Rebels players
Little Rock Travelers players
Chattanooga Lookouts players
Mukegon Muskies players
Richmond Quakers players
Grand Rapids Black Sox players
Bloomington Bloomers players
Baseball players from Chicago